is a biography attributed to Naoki Higashida, a nonverbal autistic person from Japan. It was first published in Japan in 2007. The English translation, by Keiko Yoshida and her husband, English author David Mitchell, was published in 2013.

The book alleges that its author, Higashida, learned to communicate using the scientifically discredited techniques of facilitated communication and rapid prompting. Since Higashida lacks a genuine ability to use either written or verbal language, researchers dismiss all claims that Higashida actually wrote the book himself. Psychologist Jens Hellman said that the accounts "resemble what I would deem very close to an autistic child's parents' dream." The book became a New York Times bestseller and a Sunday Times bestseller for hardback nonfiction in the UK. It has been translated into over 30 other languages.

Background
Higashida was diagnosed with autism spectrum (or 'autism spectrum disorder', ASD) when he was five years old and has limited verbal communication skills. With help from his mother, he is purported to have written the book using a method he calls "facilitated finger writing", also known as facilitated communication (FC). The method has been discredited as pseudoscience by organizations including the American Academy of Pediatrics and the American Psychological Association (APA).  Researchers dismiss the authenticity of Higashida's writings.

Synopsis
Yoshida and Mitchell, who have a child with autism, wrote the introduction to the English-language version. The majority of the memoir is told through 58 questions Higashida and many other people dealing with autism are commonly asked, as well as interspersed sections of short prose. These sections are either memories Higashida shares or parabolic stories that relate to the themes discussed throughout the memoir. The collection ends with Higashida's short story, "I'm Right Here," which the author prefaces by saying:I wrote this story in the hope that it will help you to understand how painful it is when you can't express yourself to the people you love. If this story connects with your heart in some way, then I believe you'll be able to connect back to the hearts of people with autism too.

Reception 
While the book quickly became successful in Japan, it was not until after the English translation that it reached mainstream audiences across the world. On its publication in July 2013 in the UK, it was serialised on BBC Radio 4 as 'Book of the Week' and went straight to Number 1 on the Sunday Times bestseller list. After its publication in the US (August 2013) it was featured on The Daily Show in an interview between Jon Stewart and David Mitchell and the following day it became #1 on Amazon's bestseller list. In the interview Stewart describes the memoir as "one of the most remarkable books I've read." Other celebrities also offer their support, such as Whoopi Goldberg in her gift guide section in Peoples 2013 holiday issue. In addition to traditional media outlets, the book received attention from autism advocacy groups across the globe, many, such as Autism Speaks, conducting interviews with Mitchell. Mitchell has claimed that there is video evidence showing that Hagashida is pointing to Japanese characters without any touching; however, Dr. Fein and Dr. Kamio claim that in one video where he is featured, his mother is constantly guiding his arm.

Michael Fitzpatrick, a medical writer known for writing about controversies in autism from the perspective of someone who is both a physician and a parent of a child with autism, said some skepticism of how much Higashida contributed to the book was justified because of the "scant explanation" of the process Higashida's mother used for helping him write using the character grid and expressed concern that the book "reinforces more myths than it challenges". According to Fitzpatrick, The Reason I Jump is full of "moralising" and "platitudes" that sound like the views of a middle-aged parent of a child with autism. He said the book also contains many familiar tropes that have been propagated by advocates of facilitated communication, such as "Higashida's claim that people with autism are like 'travellers from a distant, distant past' who have come...'to help the people of the world remember what truly matters for the Earth,'" which Fitzpatrick compared to the notion promoted by anti-immunisation advocates that autistic children are "heralds of environmental catastrophe".

Sallie Tisdale, writing for The New York Times, said the book raised questions about autism, but also about translation and she wondered how much the work was influenced by the three adults (Higashida's mother, Yoshida, and Mitchell) involved in translating the book and their experiences as parents of autistic children. She concluded, "We have to be careful about turning what we find into what we want."

Adaptations

Stage 

The book was adapted into a play in 2018, put on by the National Theatre of Scotland.  The adaptation featured an outdoor maze designed by the Dutch collective Observatorium, and an augmented reality app was developed for the play.

Documentary 

The book was adapted into a feature-length documentary, directed by Jerry Rothwell. The project is a co-production of Vulcan Productions, the British Film Institute, the Idea Room, MetFilm Production, and Runaway Fridge, which was presented at the 2020 Sundance Film Festival. The documentary has received positive reviews from critics. Screen Dailys Fionnula Halligan stated that "The Reason I Jump will change how you think, and how many films can say that?”, while Leslie Fleperin of Hollywood Reporter said that the documentary was “a work of cinematic alchemy”, and Guy Lodge of Variety commended the film for turning the original book into "an inventive, sensuous documentary worthy of its source." On 3 June 2020, Kino Lorber acquired The Reason I Jump to film in the United States. The film will be screened at the 2020 AFI Docs film festival.

Fall Down 7 Times Get Up 8Fall Down 7 Times Get Up 8: A Young Man's Voice from the Silence of Autism''' is a follow-up to The Reason I Jump, written in 2015 and credited to the same author, Higashida, when he was between the ages of 18 and 22. Higashida has autism and his verbal communication skills are limited, but is said to be able to communicate by pointing at letters on an alphabet chart. Skeptics have claimed that there is no proof that Higashida can communicate independently, and that the English translation represents the ideals of author David Mitchell and Keiko Yoshida. In response, Mitchell claims that there is video evidence showing that Higashida can type independently.

The book is a collection of short chapters arranged in eight sections in which Higashida explores identity, family relationships, education, society, and his personal growth. The title comes from a Japanese proverb, 七転び八起き, which literally translates as "Fall seven times and stand up eight".

The English translation by Keiko Yoshida and her husband, author David Mitchell, was released on 11 July 2017.

 See also 
Films
 Annie's Coming Out Autism Is a World Deej''

References

External links
 

2005 non-fiction books
Books about autism
Books adapted into films
Books adapted into plays
Japanese books
Facilitated communication